When We Were Kids is the debut EP by Australian electronic rock band The Galvatrons. It was released by Warner Music Australia on 3 May 2008 and produced by Lindsay Gravina. The title track was the number one most added track on radio in Australia for the week 19–26 April 2008. The EP peaked at No. 39 on the ARIA Singles Chart.

Track listing
"When We Were Kids" (Jonathan Mole)
"She's in Love" (Mole)
"Donnie's on TV" (Mole)
"When We Were Kids (Bag Raiders Remix)"
"Donnie's on TV (Bobby Broke & Dudley Moore Remix)"

Charts

References

External links
 The Galvatrons @ MySpace.com
 The Galvatrons @ Warnermusic.com.au

2008 debut EPs
The Galvatrons albums